Aartselaar (old spelling: Aertselaer) is a municipality located in the Belgian province of Antwerp. The municipality only comprises the town of Aartselaar proper. In 2021, Aartselaar had a total population of 14,455. The total area is 10.93 km². The municipality of Aartselaar is located in the southern outskirts of Antwerp. It is known for its 1801 windmill (Heimolen) as well as the cycling race called Memorial Rik Van Steenbergen and Aartselaar BBC, the official basketball club of the town.

Etymology 
The origin of the name of the town is obscure; the most probable etymology refers to "Arcelar", a clearing in the woods located near a border.

Education

The D Y Patil International school is located in this municipality and offers the international IB curriculum.

Famous residents 
Well-known persons who were born or reside in Aartselaar or have any other significant connection with the municipality:

 Frans Cools (1918 - 1999), cyclist
 Sophie De Wit (1973), politician
 Camille Paulus (1943), politician
 Karel Thijs (1918), cyclist
 Geo Verbanck (1881 - 1961), sculptor

Climate

References

External links 
 

 
Municipalities of Antwerp Province
Populated places in Antwerp Province